Originally, an alcoholate was the crystalline form of a salt in which alcohol took the place of water of crystallization, such as [SnCl3(OC2H5)·C2H5OH]2 and C8H6N4O5·CH3OH. However this denomination should not be used anymore for the ending -ate often occurs in names for anions.

The second meaning of the word is that of a tincture, or alcoholic extract of plant material.

The third, and more usual meaning of the word is as a synonym for alkoxide— is the conjugate base of an alcohol.

References

Salts
Alcohol